Chester Arthur Burnett (June 10, 1910January 10, 1976), better known by his stage name Howlin' Wolf, was an American blues singer and guitarist. He is regarded as one of the most influential blues musicians of all time. Over a four-decade career, he recorded in genres such as blues, rhythm and blues, rock and roll, and psychedelic rock. He also helped bridge the gap between Delta blues and Chicago blues. Born into poverty in Mississippi as one of six children, he went through a rough childhood where his mother kicked him out of her house, and he moved in with his great-uncle, who was particularly abusive. He then ran away to his father's house where he finally found  a happy family, and in the early 1930s became a protégé of legendary Delta blues guitarist and singer, Charley Patton. He started a solo career in the Deep South, playing with other notable blues musicians of the era, and at the end of a decade had made a name for himself in the Mississippi Delta.

After going through some legal issues and undergoing a particularly rough experience while serving in the Army, he moved to Chicago, Illinois, in adulthood and became successful. He started his recording career in 1951 after being heard singing by then 19-year-old Ike Turner, and then formed his own band in Chicago. Five of his songs managed to get on the Billboard national R&B charts, and he also released several albums in the 1960s and 1970s, and made several television performances as well. His studio albums include The Howlin' Wolf Album (1969), Message to the Young (1971), and The London Howlin' Wolf Sessions (1971). He released his final album The Back Door Wolf in 1973, and also made his last public performance in November 1975 with fellow blues legend B.B. King. After years of severely declining health, Burnett died in 1976, and was posthumously inducted in the Blues Hall of Fame in 1980, and the Rock and Roll Hall of Fame in 1991.

With a booming voice and imposing physical presence, he is one of the best-known Chicago blues artists. AllMusic has described him as "a primal, ferocious blues belter with a roster of classics rivaling anyone else, and a sandpaper growl of a voice that has been widely imitated". The musician and critic Cub Koda noted, "no one could match Howlin' Wolf for the singular ability to rock the house down to the foundation while simultaneously scaring its patrons out of its wits." Producer Sam Phillips recalled, "When I heard Howlin' Wolf, I said, 'This is for me. This is where the soul of man never dies. Several of his songs, including "Smokestack Lightnin', "Killing Floor" and "Spoonful", have become blues and blues rock standards. "Smokestack Lightnin'" was selected for a Grammy Hall of Fame Award in 1999, and three of his songs were listed by the Rock and Roll Hall of Fame in its "500 Songs That Shaped Rock and Roll". In 2011, Rolling Stone magazine ranked him number 54 on its list of the "100 Greatest Artists of All Time".

Early life

Nickname origins

Chester Arthur Burnett was born on June 10, 1910, in White Station, Mississippi, to Gertrude Jones and Leon "Dock" Burnett. He would later say that his father was "Ethiopian", while Jones had Choctaw ancestry on her father's side. He was named for Chester A. Arthur, the 21st President of the United States. The name "Howlin' Wolf" originated from Burnett's maternal grandfather, John Jones, who would admonish him for killing his grandmother's chicks from reckless squeezing by warning him that wolves in the area would come and get him; the family would continue this by calling Burnett "the Wolf". The blues historian Paul Oliver wrote that Burnett once claimed to have been given his nickname by his idol Jimmie Rodgers.

Childhood

Burnett's parents separated when he was a year old. Dock, who had worked seasonally as a farm laborer in the Mississippi Delta, moved there permanently while Jones and Burnett moved to Monroe County. Jones and Burnett would sing together in the choir of the Life Boat Baptist Church near Gibson, Mississippi, and Burnett would later claim that he got his musical talent from her. Jones kicked Burnett out of the house during the winter when he was a child for unknown reasons. He then moved in with his great-uncle Will Young, who had a large household and treated him badly. While in the Young household he worked almost all day and did not receive an education at the school house. When he was thirteen, he killed one of Young's hogs in a rage after the hog had caused him to ruin his dress clothes; this enraged Young who then whipped him while chasing him on a mule. He then ran away and claimed to have walked  barefoot to join his father, where he finally found a happy home with his father's large family. During this era he went by the name "John D." to dissociate himself from his past, a name by which several of his relatives would know him for the rest of his life. At the peak of his success, he returned from Chicago to see his mother in Mississippi and was driven to tears when she rebuffed him: she refused to take money offered by him, saying it was from his playing the "devil's music".

On January 15, 1928, at the age of 17, Burnett finally gathered enough money to buy his first guitar. It was the date that Burnett reportedly never forgot until "the day he died".

Musical career

1930s and 1940s

Early beginnings

In 1930, Burnett met Charley Patton, the most popular bluesman in the Mississippi Delta at the time. He would listen to Patton play nightly from outside a nearby juke joint. There he remembered Patton playing "Pony Blues", "High Water Everywhere", "A Spoonful Blues", and "Banty Rooster Blues". The two became acquainted, and soon Patton was teaching him guitar. Burnett recalled that "the first piece I ever played in my life was... a tune about hook up my pony and saddle up my black mare"—Patton's "Pony Blues". He also learned about showmanship from Patton: "When he played his guitar, he would turn it over backwards and forwards, and throw it around over his shoulders, between his legs, throw it up in the sky". Burnett would perform the guitar tricks he learned from Patton for the rest of his life. He played with Patton often in small Delta communities.

Burnett was influenced by other popular blues performers of the time, including the Mississippi Sheiks, Blind Lemon Jefferson, Ma Rainey, Lonnie Johnson, Tampa Red, Blind Blake, and Tommy Johnson. Two of the earliest songs he mastered were Jefferson's "Match Box Blues" and Leroy Carr's "How Long, How Long Blues". The country singer Jimmie Rodgers was also an influence. Burnett tried to emulate Rodgers's "blue yodel" but found that his efforts sounded more like a growl or a howl: "I couldn't do no yodelin', so I turned to howlin'. And it's done me just fine". His harmonica playing was modeled after that of Sonny Boy Williamson II, who taught him how to play when Burnett moved to Parkin, Arkansas, in 1933.

During the 1930s, Burnett performed in the South as a solo performer and with numerous blues musicians, including Floyd Jones, Johnny Shines, Honeyboy Edwards, Sonny Boy Williamson II, Robert Johnson, Robert Lockwood, Jr., Willie Brown, Son House and Willie Johnson. By the end of the decade, he was a fixture in clubs, with a harmonica and an early electric guitar. It was around this time that Burnett got into some legal trouble in Hughes, Arkansas: While he was in town, he tried to protect a female acquaintance from an angry boyfriend, and the two men fought, with Burnett killing the man with a hoe. What happened after this is a matter of dispute; Burnett either fled the area, or did some jail time.

Military service

On April 9, 1941, he was inducted into the U.S. Army and was stationed at several bases around the country. Years later, he stated that the plantation workers in the Delta had alerted military authorities because he refused to work in the fields. He was assigned to the 9th Cavalry Regiment, which was famous for being one of the unit's dubbed "Buffalo Soldiers". Burnett was first sent to Pine Bluff, Arkansas for basic training, and was given long hours performing menial work. Then after that, he was transferred to Camp Blanding, located in Starke, Florida, where he was assigned to the kitchen patrol. In the day time, he would cook food for the enlisted soldiers, and at night he would play the guitar in the assembly room. Burnett was later sent to Fort Gordon, located in Georgia, and he would play his guitar on the steps of the mess hall, which is where a young James Brown, who came to the Fort nearly every day to earn money shining shoes and performing buck dances for the troops, first heard him play.

Burnett was then sent to a tutoring camp in Tacoma, Washington, where he was in charge of decoding communications. Because Burnett was functionally illiterate, having never received formal education, he was repeatedly beaten by the drill instructor for reading and spelling errors. Soon, Burnett began having uncontrollable shaking fits, dizzy spells, fainting, and also began experiencing mental confusion.

Burnett participated in the Louisiana Maneuvers in 1941, where one of the earliest photographs of him was taken of him cleaning the frog of a horse's hoof. In 1943, He was evaluated at an Army mental hospital. In November 1943, Burnett was found unfit for duty and given an honorable discharge on November 3. Recalling his experiences in the Army years later, Burnett stated, "The Army ain’t no place for a black man," Jus’ couldn't take all that bossin’ around, I guess. The Wolf's his own boss."

He returned to his family, which had recently moved near West Memphis, Arkansas, and helped with the farming while also performing, as he had done in the 1930s, with Floyd Jones and others. In 1948 he formed a band, which included the guitarists Willie Johnson and Matt "Guitar" Murphy, the harmonica player Junior Parker, a pianist remembered only as "Destruction" and the drummer Willie Steele. Radio station KWEM in West Memphis began broadcasting his live performances, and he occasionally sat in with Williamson on KFFA in Helena, Arkansas.

1950s

First recordings and initial success
In 1951, Ike Turner, who was a freelance talent scout, heard Howlin' Wolf in West Memphis. Turner brought him to record several songs for Sam Phillips at Memphis Recording Service (later renamed Sun Studio) and the Bihari brothers at Modern Records. Phillips praised his singing, saying, "God, what it would be worth on film to see the fervour in that man's face when he sang. His eyes would light up, you'd see the veins come out on his neck and, buddy, there was nothing on his mind but that song. He sang with his damn soul." Howlin' Wolf quickly became a local celebrity and began working with a band that included the guitarists Willie Johnson and Pat Hare. Sun Records had not yet been formed, so Phillips licensed his recording to Chess Records. Howlin' Wolf's first singles were issued by two different record companies in 1951: "Moanin' at Midnight"/"How Many More Years" released on Chess, "Riding in the Moonlight"/"Morning at Midnight," and "Passing By Blues"/"Crying at Daybreak" released on Modern's subsidiary RPM Records. In December 1951, Leonard Chess was able to secure Howlin' Wolf's contract, and at the urging of Chess, he relocated to Chicago in late 1952.

In Chicago, Howlin' Wolf assembled a new band and recruited the Chicagoan Jody Williams from Memphis Slim's band as his first guitarist. Within a year he had persuaded the guitarist Hubert Sumlin to leave Memphis and join him in Chicago; Sumlin's understated solos and surprisingly subtle phrasing perfectly complemented Burnett's huge voice. The lineup of the Howlin' Wolf band changed often over the years. He employed many different guitarists, both on recordings and in live performance, including Willie Johnson, Jody Williams, Lee Cooper, L.D. McGhee, Otis "Big Smokey" Smothers, his brother Little Smokey Smothers, Jimmy Rogers, Freddie Robinson, and Buddy Guy, among others. Burnett was able to attract some of the best musicians available because of his policy, unusual among bandleaders, of paying his musicians well and on time, even including unemployment insurance and Social Security contributions. With the exception of a couple of brief absences in the late 1950s, Sumlin remained a member of the band for the rest of Howlin' Wolf's career and is the guitarist most often associated with the Chicago Howlin' Wolf sound.

Howlin' Wolf had a series of hits with songs written by Willie Dixon, who had been hired by the Chess brothers in 1950 as a songwriter, and during that period the competition between Muddy Waters and Howlin' Wolf was intense. Dixon reported "Every once in a while Wolf would mention the fact that, 'Hey man, you wrote that song for Muddy. How come you won't write me one like that?' But when you'd write for him he wouldn't like it." So, Dixon decided to use reverse psychology on him, by introducing the songs to Wolf as written for Muddy, thus inducing Wolf to accept them.

In the 1950s, Howlin' Wolf had five songs on the Billboard national R&B charts: "Moanin' at Midnight", "How Many More Years", "Who Will Be Next", "Smokestack Lightning", and "I Asked for Water (She Gave Me Gasoline)". His first LP, Moanin' in the Moonlight, was released in 1959. As was standard practice in that era, it was a collection of previously released singles.

1960s and 1970s

Album releases and European tours
In the early 1960s, Howlin' Wolf recorded several songs that became his most famous, despite receiving no radio play: "Wang Dang Doodle", "Back Door Man", "Spoonful", "The Red Rooster" (later known as "Little Red Rooster"), "I Ain't Superstitious", "Goin' Down Slow", and "Killing Floor", many of which were written by Willie Dixon. Several became part of the repertoires of British and American rock groups, who further popularized them. Howlin' Wolf's second compilation album, Howlin' Wolf (often called "the rocking chair album", from its cover illustration), was released in 1962.

During the blues revival in the 1950s and 1960s, black blues musicians found a new audience among white youths, and Howlin' Wolf was among the first to capitalize on it. He toured Europe in 1964 as part of the American Folk Blues Festival, produced by the German promoters Horst Lippmann and Fritz Rau. In 1965, he appeared on the popular television program Shindig! at the insistence of the Rolling Stones, whose recording of "Little Red Rooster" had reached number one in the UK in 1964. In the late 1960s and early 1970s, Howlin' Wolf recorded albums with others, including The Super Super Blues Band, with Bo Diddley and Muddy Waters; The Howlin' Wolf Album, with psychedelic rock and free-jazz musicians like Gene Barge, Pete Cosey, Roland Faulkner, Morris Jennings, Louis Satterfield, Charles Stepney and Phil Upchurch; and The London Howlin' Wolf Sessions, accompanied by the British rock musicians Eric Clapton, Steve Winwood, Ian Stewart, Bill Wyman, Charlie Watts and others.

The Howlin' Wolf Album, like rival bluesman Muddy Waters's album Electric Mud, was designed to appeal to the hippie audience. The album had an attention-getting cover: large black letters on a white background proclaiming "This is Howlin' Wolf's new album. He doesn't like it. He didn't like his electric guitar at first either." The album cover may have contributed to its poor sales. Chess co-founder Leonard Chess admitted that the cover was a bad idea, saying, "I guess negativity isn't a good way to sell records. Who wants to hear that a musician doesn't like his own music?"

The London Howlin' Wolf Sessions, like Muddy Waters's London album, proved more successful with British audiences than American.

Wolf's last album was 1973's The Back Door Wolf. Entirely composed of new material, it was recorded with musicians who regularly backed him on stage, including Hubert Sumlin, Detroit Junior, Andrew "Blueblood" McMahon, Chico Chism, Lafayette "Shorty" Gilbert and the bandleader Eddie Shaw. The album is shorter (a little more than 35 minutes) than any other he recorded, as a result of his declining health.

Last performance

Wolf's last public performance was in November 1975 at the International Amphitheatre, located in Chicago. He shared the bill with B.B. King, Albert King, Luther Allison, and O.V. Wright. Wolf reportedly gave an "unforgettable" performance, even crawling across the stage during the song, "Crawling King Snake." The crowd gave him a five-minute standing ovation. When he got off the stage after the concert was over, a team of paramedics had to revive him.

Musical style
Wolf is among the most influential blues musicians of the postwar years. He was at the forefront of transforming the rural acoustic blues of the South, to the electric, more urban blues of Chicago. When Wolf first formed his band in West Memphis, Arkansas, his sound was much more aggressive, with guitarist Willie Johnson's raucous, distorted guitar playing being the signature sound of his early recordings. When Wolf switched guitarists and added Hubert Sumlin to his lineup, his sound became less aggressive with Sumlin adding "angular riffing" and "wild soloing". He also adopted the backbeat that Chicago blues was mainly known for.

Equipment
Although Sumlin was the main guitar player in Wolf's band, Wolf played a number of guitars himself throughout the years. He played a 1965 Epiphone Casino on his musical tour in Europe, a Fender Coronado, a Gibson Firebird V in the "Down in the Bottom" video recorded in 1966, a white Fender Stratocaster, a Teisco Tre-100, and he also played a Kay K-161 ThinTwin in his earlier years. The Kay K-161 ThinTwin is currently residing in the Rock & Roll Hall of Fame located in Cleveland, Ohio.

Personal life
Burnett was noted for his disciplined approach to his personal finances. Having already achieved a measure of success in Memphis, he described himself as "the onliest one to drive himself up from the Delta" to Chicago, which he did, in his own car on the Blues Highway and with $4,000 in his pocket, a rare distinction for a black bluesman of the time. Although functionally illiterate into his forties, Burnett eventually returned to school, first to earn a General Educational Development (GED) diploma and later to study accounting and other business courses to help manage his career.

Burnett met his future wife, Lillie Handley (1925–2001), when she attended one of his performances at a Chicago club. She and her family were urban and educated and were not involved in what was considered the unsavory world of blues musicians. Nevertheless, he was attracted to her as soon as he saw her in the audience. He immediately pursued her and won her over. According to those who knew them, the couple remained deeply in love until his death. Together, they raised two daughters Betty and Barbara, Lillie's daughters from an earlier relationship. West Coast rapper Skeme is his great nephew, who was born 14 years after his death.

After he married Lillie, who was able to manage his professional finances, Burnett was so financially successful that he was able to offer band members not only a decent salary but benefits such as health insurance; this enabled him to hire his pick of available musicians and keep his band one of the best around. According to his stepdaughters, he was never financially extravagant (for instance, he drove a Pontiac station wagon rather than a more expensive, flashy car).

Health
Burnett's health began declining in the late 1960s. He suffered his first heart attack in 1969 as he and Hubert Sumlin were traveling to a show at University of Chicago. He fell against the dashboard of the car he was riding in, and Sumlin, who was driving, pulled over and grabbed a two-by-four piece of wood that was lying in the road. Sumlin then rammed the wood into Burnett's back, which kick-started his heart. Three weeks later, while he was in Toronto for a gig, Burnett suffered additional heart and kidney problems, but refused an operation recommended by doctors, telling his wife that "he needed to keep working".

In 1970, Burnett was involved in a serious car accident that sent him flying through the windshield, which caused extensive damage to his kidneys. For the rest of his life, he received dialysis treatments every three days, which was administered by his wife Lillie. In May that same year, while he was in the United Kingdom to record "The London Howlin' Wolf Sessions", his health problems worsened. A year later, Burnett suffered another heart attack, and his kidneys had failed. He also began suffering from high blood pressure as well. By May 1973, Burnett was back performing again. The bandleader, Eddie Shaw, was so concerned for Burnett's health that he limited him to performing six songs per concert.

Death
In January 1976, Burnett checked into the Edward Hines Jr. Veterans Administration Hospital in Hines, Illinois, for kidney surgery. Three days before his death, a carcinoma was found in his brain. He died from a combination of the tumor, heart failure, and kidney disease on January 10, 1976, at the age of 65. He was buried in Oakridge Cemetery, outside Chicago, in a plot in Section 18, on the east side of the road. His gravestone has an image of a guitar and harmonica etched into it.

Legacy 
In 1980, Burnett was posthumously inducted into the Blues Foundation's Blues Hall of Fame. He was also inducted into the Rock & Roll Hall of Fame as an early influence, and the Hall of Fame located in his hometown of West Point, Mississippi, in 1995.

On September 17, 1994, the U.S. Postal Service issued a 29-cent commemorative postage stamp depicting Howlin' Wolf.

On September 1, 2005, the Howlin' Wolf Blues Museum opened in West Point, Mississippi. The museum is located at 57 E. Westbrook Street, and an annual festival is held there.

The experimental rock band Swans performs a song titled "Just A Little Boy (for Chester Burnett)" on their 2014 album To Be Kind. The song takes heavy blues inspiration and features lead singer Michael Gira vocalizing in a manner similar to Burnett's howling style.

Howlin' Wolf Foundation
The Howlin' Wolf Foundation, a nonprofit corporation organized under the US tax code, section 501(c)(3), was established by Bettye Kelly to preserve and extend Howlin' Wolf's legacy. The foundation's mission and goals include the preservation of the blues music genre, scholarships to enable students to participate in music programs, and support for blues musicians and blues programs.

Awards and nominations
In 1972, Howlin' Wolf was awarded an honorary doctor of arts degree from Columbia College in Chicago.

Grammy Hall of Fame
A Howlin' Wolf recording of "Smokestack Lightning" was selected for a Grammy Hall of Fame Award, an award established in 1973 to honor recordings that are at least 25 years old and have "qualitative or historical significance".

Rock and Roll Hall of Fame
The Rock and Roll Hall of Fame listed three songs by Howlin' Wolf in its "500 Songs That Shaped Rock and Roll".

The Blues Foundation Awards

Inductions

Discography

Albums
1959: Moanin' in the Moonlight (Chess) 1951–1958 recordings
1962: Howlin' Wolf (Chess) 1957–1962 recordings
1962: Howling Wolf Sings the Blues (Crown) 1951–1952 recordings
1965: The Real Folk Blues (Chess) 1956–1965 recordings
1967: More Real Folk Blues (Chess) 1953–1956 recordings
1968: The Super Super Blues Band (Chess) with Muddy Waters and Bo Diddley
1969: The Howlin' Wolf Album (Cadet Concept)
1971: Message to the Young (Chess)
1971: The London Howlin' Wolf Sessions (Chess)
1972: Chester Burnett a/k/a/ Howlin' Wolf (Chess) 1951–1965 recordings
1972: Live and Cookin' (Chess)
1973: The Back Door Wolf (Chess)
1974: London Revisited (Chess) split album with Muddy Waters
1975: Change My Way (Chess) 1958–1966 recordings
1977: The Legendary Sun Performers (Charly)
1979: Heart Like Railroad Steel (Memphis & Chicago Blues 1951–57) (Blues Ball)
1979: Can't Put Me Out (Chicago 1956–72, Volume II) (Blues Ball)
1984: Muddy & the Wolf (Chess) split album with Muddy Waters
1984: His Greatest Sides, Volume One (Chess)
1991: Howlin' Wolf – The Chess Box (Chess)
1991: Howlin' Wolf Rides Again (Flair/Virgin)
1994: Ain't Gonna Be Your Dog: Chess Collectibles, Vol. 2 (Chess)
1997: His Best (Chess); reissued as The Definitive Collection (Geffen)

Singles

Sessionography

Notes

Citations

Explanatory notes

General references

External links

 

1910 births
1976 deaths
20th-century African-American male singers
20th-century American guitarists
African-American guitarists
African-American male singer-songwriters
American blues guitarists
American blues harmonica players
American blues singers
American harmonica players
American male guitarists
Blues musicians from Mississippi
Chess Records artists
Chicago blues musicians
Crown Records artists
Guitarists from Illinois
Guitarists from Mississippi
Guitarists from Tennessee
People from Clay County, Mississippi
People from Memphis, Tennessee
RPM Records (United States) artists
Singer-songwriters from Illinois
Singer-songwriters from Mississippi
Singer-songwriters from Tennessee